General elections were held in Guyana on 19 March 2001. The result was a victory for the People's Progressive Party, which won 34 of the 65 seats. Voter turnout was 91.7%.

Electoral system
Under the new electoral law adopted in February 2001, the 65 members of the National Assembly were elected by closed list proportional representation in two groups; 25 members were elected from the 10 electoral districts based on the regions, and 40 elected from a single nationwide constituency. Seats were allocated using the Hare quota. The pre-2001 arrangement under which 10 seats appointed by the Regional Councils and 2 by the National Congress of Local Democratic Organs (an umbrella body representing the regional councils) was abolished, and thus the entire National Assembly was elected by direct popular vote for the first time since 1973.

The President was elected by a first-past-the-post double simultaneous vote system, whereby each list nominated a presidential candidate and the presidential election itself was won by the candidate of the list having a plurality.

Results

References

Guyana
2001 in Guyana
Elections in Guyana
March 2001 events in South America